Noboru Ueno (born 8 January 1917) was a Japanese track and field athlete. He competed in the men's javelin throw at the 1936 Summer Olympics.

References

External links
 

1917 births
Possibly living people
Place of birth missing
Japanese male javelin throwers
Olympic male javelin throwers
Olympic athletes of Japan
Athletes (track and field) at the 1936 Summer Olympics
Japan Championships in Athletics winners
20th-century Japanese people